Eupithecia chlorophora is a moth in the family Geometridae first described by Charles Swinhoe in 1895. It is found in northeast India's Khasi Hills.

References

Moths described in 1895
chlorophora
Moths of Asia